Ben Eckermann (born 12 March 1987) is an Australian rules football midfielder who played for Port Adelaide in the Australian Football League (AFL) and Sturt in the South Australian National Football League (SANFL).

Eckermann was selected with the 51st pick in the 2004 AFL Draft and made his AFL debut in Round Seven of the 2005 AFL season. In his fourth game Eckermann was concussed when he was bumped front-on by West Coast Eagles player Tyson Stenglein. The incident was seen as a precursor to stronger penalties for front-on contact to the head. The game would be his last AFL match, when he was delisted at the end of the 2006 season.

References

External links 

1987 births
Australian rules footballers from South Australia
Living people
Port Adelaide Football Club players
Port Adelaide Football Club players (all competitions)
Sturt Football Club players